H47 may refer to :
 Boeing-Vertol H-47 Chinook, an American helicopter
 , a Royal Navy B-class destroyer
 , a Royal Navy H-class submarine
 Hyampom Airport, in Trinity County, California, United States